The decade of the 1760s in archaeology involved some significant events.

Explorations
 1764: First systematic mapping of the Antonine Wall by William Roy.

Excavations
 Formal excavations continue at Pompeii.
 1757: Rev. Bryan Faussett begins excavations at Anglo-Saxon cemeteries in Kent, England.

Finds
 1761-1767: Carsten Niebuhr transcribes the cuneiform inscriptions at Persepolis.
 1765: Nathaniel Davison discovers a stress-relieving chamber (Davison's chamber) above the Kings chamber in the Great Pyramid of Giza.

Publications
 1762: James "Athenian" Stuart and Nicholas Revett's Antiquities of Athens.
 1764:
 Robert Adam's Ruins of the Palace of the Emperor Diocletian at Spalatro in Dalmatia.
 Johann Joachim Winckelmann's Geschichte der Kunst des Alterthums ("History of Ancient Art").

Other events
1764: French scholar Jean-Jacques Barthélemy deciphers the Phoenician language using the inscriptions on the Cippi of Melqart from Malta.

Births
 1760: 
 January 6 - Richard Polwhele, Cornish antiquarian (d. 1838)
 June 8 - Karl Böttiger, German archaeologist (d. 1835)
 1763:
 November 19 - Karl Ludwig Fernow, German art critic and archaeologist (d. 1808)
 Samuel Lysons, English antiquarian (d. 1819)
 1766: March 16? - Jean-Frédéric Waldeck, French antiquarian, cartographer, artist and explorer (d. 1875)
 1769:
 March 23 - William Smith, English geologist (d. 1839)
 August 23 - Georges Cuvier, French naturalist, zoologist and paleontologist (d. 1832)
 September 14 - Alexander von Humboldt, Prussian explorer and writer (d. 1859)

Deaths
 1765: 
 March 3 - William Stukeley, English antiquarian (b. 1689)
 September 5 - Anne Claude de Caylus, French archaeologist (d. 1765)
 1767: June 17 - Jean-Baptiste Greppo, French canon and archaeologist (b. 1712)
 1768: June 8 - Johann Joachim Winckelmann, German art critic and archaeologist (b. 1717)

References

Archaeology by decade
Archaeology